Demos Yu-bou Chiang, born on 10 September 1976 in Taipei, Taiwan, is a Taiwanese and Canadian businessman. He founded DEM Inc. (橙果設計), a popular design studio in Taiwan in July 2003 and has served as its chairman since then. He is also known for being the great-grandson of the late Republic of China (ROC) President Chiang Kai-shek and the grandson of late President Chiang Ching-kuo. His grandmother was Faina Ipatyevna Vakhreva, also known as Chiang Fang-liang.

Biography
Born to Chiang Ching-kuo's third son Chiang Hsiao-yung and his wife Chiang Fang Chi-yi, he is the eldest of three sons. Demos Chiang was raised in Taipei until his grandfather's death in 1988. After his grandfather's death, Chiang's parents sent him to live in Canada and later the United States, though he still retained his ROC nationality, it also started the departure from politics for Demo's parents. Chiang received a bachelor's degree in Information Management from New York University in late 1990s. After graduating, Chiang worked in the entertainment and fashion industries in Taiwan, Hong Kong and Singapore, until founding DEM Inc. in 2003.

In Spring 2001, Chiang began a relationship with local starlet Lin Heng-yi (林姮怡), the daughter of Buddhist Tzu Chi General Hospital's then president Lin Hsin-jung (林欣榮). The couple married in February 2003 and now have a daughter born in 2003 and a son born in 2005.

Despite his pedigree and celebrity identity, Demos Chiang has repeatedly announced in recent years that he is not interested in political affairs. He has also accused both the Kuomintang and the Democratic Progressive Party for "poor political tactics", especially for utilizing Chiang Kai-shek and Chiang Ching-kuo as figures of worship or denigration. In contrast to other prominent members of the Chiang family, such as John Chiang and his mother Chiang Fang Chi-yi, Demos Chiang has expressed his belief that the controversies of his ancestors should be faced fairly and left to history. He started a personal blog in January 2008 to further explain his beliefs.

References

External links
DEM Inc.
Personal Blog 

1976 births
Living people
Chiang Kai-shek family
New York University alumni
Businesspeople from Taipei
Taiwanese people of Belarusian descent
Canadian people of Taiwanese descent